Haggie is a surname. Notable people with the surname include:

Dick Haggie (1933–2005), New Zealand rugby league player 
John Haggie (born 1954), Canadian politician

See also
Maggie

Surnames of Scottish origin